Against the Grain is the fifth album by singer-songwriter Phoebe Snow, released in 1978.

Overview

At the time of the release of Against the Grain, Phoebe Snow called it her "rockiest" album, "a deliberate turning away from the jazz influences" of her earlier recordings.  Peter Reilly of Stereo Review recognized the album's intent to "mark [Snow's] entrance into Outright Rock-&-Roll", dismissing it as "merely a paraphrase of real rock" and lamenting that "a singer who...has shown a real flair for projecting a lyric with poignancy and feeling has made such an awkward and clumsy turnabout."

Rising no higher than #100 on the Billboard 200, Against the Grain became Snow's second album to seriously under-perform, ending her association with Columbia Records. Snow would have one album release in the next ten years, which was Rock Away, touted as her move into "rock-&-roll". In interviews concurrent with the 1981 release of Rock Away, Snow would label Against the Grain a "disaster": "[it] tried to be a rock album but had too many opinions. Everybody who played, sang or cleaned up the studio produced that album...Putting [Paul McCartney's "Every Night"]" - which afforded Snow a hit in the UK and Australia - "was the one idea of mine that filtered through." 

In a retrospective review for Allmusic, critic William Ruhlmann wrote of the album "The decision to add Barry Beckett as co-producer with Phil Ramone helped add an R&B depth and fervor, but 'Against the Grain' was just a more impassioned effort than its predecessor." Robert Christgau wrote of the album; "this time she dies on the non-originals...Paul McCartney's Every Night' shows up the hooklessness of almost everything else."

Track listing
Songs written by Phoebe Snow, except where noted.

Side One
 "Every Night" (Paul McCartney) – 3:31	
 "Do Right Woman, Do Right Man" (Chips Moman, Dan Penn) – 4:08
 "He's Not Just Another Man" (Clyde Wilson, Brian Holland) – 2:59
 "Random Time" – 3:39
 "In My Life" (Patti Austin) – 5:02 	

Side Two
 "You Have Not Won" – 4:22
 "Mama Don't Break Down" – 3:06	
 "Oh L.A." – 3:17	
 "The Married Men" (Maggie Roche) – 3:44
 "Keep a Watch on the Shoreline" – 4:39

Charts

Personnel 
 Phoebe Snow – acoustic guitar, lead vocals, backing vocals
 Barry Beckett – keyboards, acoustic piano, synthesizers
 Dave Grusin – keyboards
 Richard Tee – electric piano
 Steve Burgh – electric guitar, slide guitar
 Steve Khan – 12-string guitar, acoustic guitar, electric guitar, guitar solo
 Hugh McCracken – 12-string guitar, acoustic guitar, electric guitar
 Jeff Mironov – electric guitar, guitar solo
 Warren Nichols – pedal steel guitar
 Will Lee – bass 
 Hugh MacDonald – bass 
 Doug Stegmeyer – bass 
 Liberty DeVitto – drums
 Rick Marotta – drums
 Ralph MacDonald – percussion
 Michael Brecker – saxophone, sax solo
 Jon Faddis – flugelhorn, flugelhorn solo
 Corky Hale – harp
 Margo Chapman – backing vocals
 Michael Gray – backing vocals
 Lani Groves – backing vocals
 Gwen Guthrie – backing vocals
 Linda LaPresti – backing vocals

Production 
 Barry Beckett – producer, mixing 
 Phil Ramone – producer 
 Burt Szerlip – engineer 
 Steve Melton – remixing
 Ted Jensen – mastering at Sterling Sound (New York City, New York)
 Paula Scher – design 
 Benno Friedman – photography

References

Phoebe Snow albums
1978 albums
Albums produced by Barry Beckett
Albums produced by Phil Ramone
Columbia Records albums